The Cooper A-2 (flight jacket or flying jacket) is a leather jacket, made by Cooper Sportswear, from sheepskin worn by United States Army Air Forces and United States Air Force pilots, during World War II. It was replaced after World War Two by nylon versions of the jacket, though it continued to be worn operationally during the Korean War by World War II veterans called back into service.  It was re-introduced by the military just prior to Operation Desert Shield, with a modification to allow for modern insignia on the front of the jacket, and has been in service ever since.

Key features of a military-specification jacket (as opposed to a civilian version) are one-piece back (some knock-off jackets have a seam across the shoulder blades; this seam causes discomfort during long flights in a confined position) and lack of side-entry hand-warmer pockets under the large snap-down patch pockets (apparently, the military designers did not want their pilots to be seen standing around with their hands in their pockets and believed that a lack of hand-warmer pockets would force pilots to be more productive and appear more professional) and no interior pocket.

Other key features include horsehide or goatskin leather for the shell, dual-knit waist and wrist cuffs, full-length brass zipper, two brass grommets under each armpit for ventilation, a metal hook under the collar to fasten the top of the opening, and a snap-down collar, so the tips won't blow around from propwash and jetwash. Seams on the arms of the jacket run along the backside of the pattern so as not to interfere with the movement of the arms along the sides of the torso in confined spaces. Military specifications did not provide for insulation of the A-2 model.

New-build A-2s for USAF members include a velcro patch on the left breast for removable insignia, whereas World War Two models had a thin 1-inch high by 4-inch long leather name tag sewn or glued directly to the leather jacket.

Cooper Sportswear ceased production in the late 1990s, and retailer inventories were exhausted some time afterwards. Even though the A-2 is still a military-requisitioned item and contracts have been awarded to other USA suppliers using the A-2 pattern, the Cooper label is considered collectible and highly sought after by World War II re-enactors and historians. A vintage Cooper A-2 in excellent condition can be worth more than the market rate of a new-build A-2 from a current manufacturer. While original Cooper jackets are no longer in production, reproductions of Cooper jackets are being manufactured by Ohio-based US Wings Inc. US Wings was partnered with Cooper Sportswear from the 1980s until Cooper ceased production in the 1990s and now owns the rights to the Cooper name. US Wings is reproducing Cooper A-2s, G-1s and Indy Jackets under their Cooper Originals line with a label reminiscent of the original Cooper Sportswear label.

See also
A-2 jacket
B-32 jacket
G-1 military flight jacket
MA-1 bomber jacket
Flight jacket

References

Jackets
United States military uniforms
Military equipment introduced from 1940 to 1944